Narasimha Reddy may refer to

People
 B. N. Reddy (1908–1977), an Indian filmmaker whose full name is Bommireddy Narasimha Reddy
 Kommidi Narasimha Reddy, also known as Bhudhan Reddy, an Indian politician
 L. Narasimha Reddy (born 1953), Indian Judge
 Nayani Narasimha Reddy (1934–2020), an Indian politician. 
 Bhimreddy Narasimha Reddy, an Indian freedom fighter
 Uyyalawada Narasimha Reddy (1806–1847), an Indian freedom fighter
 Thummala Narsimha Reddy (1976–2021), commonly known as TNR, was an Indian television presenter

Other
 Nalla Narasimha Reddy Education Society's Group of Institutions, Indian, the educational organization 
 Sye Raa Narasimha Reddy, a 2019 Indian film